Obsesión is a 2006 album by the Chilean singer Daniela Castillo. The album had two singles; first in 2006 "Volar" which reached No. 10 in Chilean charts, and then 2007 "Obsesión" which peaked at 42.

Track listing
 Obsesión
 Duele en el alma
 Volar
 En que lugar
 Me robé un corazón
 En carne viva
 Sin ti
 No me queda nada
 Miénteme primero
 Hoy
 Estés donde estés

References

2006 albums